Greg Richards (born 12 July 1995) is an English rugby league footballer who plays as a  for Toulouse Olympique in the RFL Championship, on season-long loan from Hull Kingston Rovers in the Betfred Super League.

He played for St Helens in the Super League, and on loan from Saints at the Rochdale Hornets and the Sheffield Eagles in the Championship. Richards also played in the Super League and the Betfred Championship for both the Leigh Centurions] and the London Broncos.

Background
Richards was born in Urswick, Cumbria, England. He attended Ulverston Victoria High School 

He started his career with amateur club Barrow Island.

Career

St Helens
He was signed by St Helens. He made his first team début in July 2013 in a Super League game against Castleford.

He appeared in the 2014 Super League Grand Final as a substitute in Saints' 14–6 victory over the Wigan Warriors at Old Trafford.  

During the 2017 season, Richards was sent to Kingstone Press Championship side the Sheffield Eagles as part of a Dual registration deal with Saints. Here, he played just three games before returning.

Leigh Centurions
Shortly after his departure from the Eagles came his departure from the Saints, as he joined then struggling Super League outfit Leigh.

He played for the Leigh Centurions in the 2018 Betfred Championship.

London Broncos
On 31 October 2018 it was announced that Richards had joined the London Broncos ahead of the 2019 Super League season.

Hull Kingston Rovers
On 8 Sep 2021 it was reported that he had signed for Hull Kingston Rovers in the Super League

Club statistics

References

External links
London Broncos profile
Leigh Centurions profile
St Helens profile
Profile at Saints Heritage Society
SL profile

1995 births
Living people
Dewsbury Rams players
English rugby league players
Hull Kingston Rovers players
Leigh Leopards players
London Broncos players
Rochdale Hornets players
Rugby league players from Cumbria
Rugby league props
Sheffield Eagles players
St Helens R.F.C. players
Toulouse Olympique players